Bloggingheads.tv (sometimes abbreviated "bhtv") is a political, world events, philosophy, and science video blog discussion site in which the participants take part in an active back and forth conversation via webcam which is then broadcast online to viewers. The site was started by the journalist and author Robert Wright and the blogger and journalist Mickey Kaus on November 1, 2005. Kaus has since dropped out of operational duties of the site as he didn't want his frequent linking to be seen as a conflict of interest. Most of the earlier discussions posted to the site involved one or both of those individuals, but since has grown to include a total of over one thousand individual contributors, mostly journalists, academics, scientists, authors, well known political bloggers, and other notable individuals.

Unregistered users are able to view all of the videos which are contained on the site, while free registration is required to comment on the individual discussions, or participate in the forums.

In April 2022, Wright announced that Bloggingheads will be ending, stating that "the era in which Bloggingheads makes sense is kinda over."

Format 
Bloggingheads discussions are conducted via webcam between two (or more) people, and can be viewed online in Flash format, or downloaded as WMV video files, MP4 video files, or MP3 sound files. New diavlogs are generally posted daily, and are all archived for future viewing. The diavlogs are generally broken up into a series of topics and subtopics a few minutes in length, links to which are placed below the video window to allow viewers to navigate to a given topic if they do not wish to view the whole discussion.

Most of the discussions posted to Bloggingheads.tv involve well known (or semi-well known) journalists, bloggers, science writers, scientists, philosophers, book authors, or other specialists in segments of current world events. Many of the discussions are of a political nature or are related to the current political environment. Those with differing points of view are often matched against one another. Diavlogs involving guests appearing for the first time often take the form of an interview, more often than that of a discussion, with a longtime Bloggingheads contributor playing the role of interviewer.

Regular segments
Although most episodes and matchups do not occur on any kind of a regular basis, there are a few notable exceptions to this. There is a frequent  diavlog matchup between the two co-founders of Bloggingheads.tv, Robert Wright and Mickey Kaus, generally related to politics in some form, that usually occurs on either Wednesday or Thursday. While some of the other diavloggers are frequently matched against each other (e.g. David Corn & James Pinkerton) there is usually not a regularly scheduled time at which they take place.

"Science Saturday" was the name given to the weekly episode appearing on Saturday that was always science related. Its last episode was released on December 24, 2011. It usually (but not always) involved either one or both of the science writers John Horgan and George Johnson. Many well-known people in the science community were a part of Science Saturday, including Michael Shermer of Skeptic Magazine, biologist PZ Myers, Craig Venter of the Human Genome Project, aging researcher and biogerentologist Aubrey de Grey, and philosopher David Chalmers, among many others. However, in September 2009, four high-profile science bloggers who had previously participated in Bloggingheads.tv discussions publicly distanced themselves from the site and stated they would no longer agree to appear in Bloggingheads.tv segments. The scientists – Sean Carroll, Carl Zimmer, Phil Plait and PZ Myers – all criticized what they claimed was a policy by Bloggingheads.tv to provide a platform for the anti-scientific ideology, Creationism without an opposing point of view for balance. PZ Myers said: "[Bloggingheads.tv] was setting up crackpots with softball interviews that made them look reasonable, because their peculiar ideas were never confronted."

"The Week in Blog" was a weekly segment which normally appeared on the site on Fridays. Its last episode was released on March 7, 2012. The format was to discuss what has showed up on the past week on both liberal and conservative blogs, from both a liberal and conservative viewpoint. The three regular hosts of "TWIB" were Bill Scher of Liberal Oasis, Kristin Soltis of the Winston Group, and Matt Lewis of The Daily Caller. Original host Conn Carroll of The Heritage Foundation stepped aside in early 2009. Guests who appeared on the show are Armando Llorens (of Daily Kos), Amanda Carpenter, and Nate Silver (of FiveThirtyEight) among many others.

History 
On November 1, 2005, the site launched, with Robert Wright and Mickey Kaus as the only two initial participants in the video discussions. The site has since featured more than one thousand other diavloggers.

On October 18, 2006, a site redesign was launched, with a revised home page and improved functionality: ability to comment on diavlogs was added, and to participate in forum discussions.

In January 2007, it was announced that cable TV pioneer and C-SPAN founding chairman Bob Rosencrans, with a loose network of others, would become an angel investor of Bloggingheads.tv. The infusion of cash kicked off a dramatic expansion of the site's content, and a corresponding growth in viewers.

On March 24, 2007, in a diavlog between Garance Franke-Ruta and Ann Althouse, Althouse became quite animated and angry (to the point of yelling) over a comment Franke-Ruta made (in reference to an earlier controversy involving Jessica Valenti and former US president Bill Clinton) referred to as an on-air "meltdown" by some. This led to many blog posts and news stories in the following days on both the initial controversy and Althouse's on air behavior.

On October 13, 2007, a conversion to Flash format from the initial Windows Media format took place.

On October 24, 2007, Bloggingheads.tv entered into a relationship with The New York Times, whereby selected video segments from the Bloggingheads site would appear in the "Videos" section on the Times website, under the Opinion subsection.

On December 13, 2007, a site redesign took place which removed the familiar green pages in favor of a more "Web 2.0"-look, featuring more user generated content, new navigation, new forum software for the "comments" section, and other updated features.

In 2008, several new segments and diavloggers were added or made more regular, including "Free Will", "This Week in Blog", and "UN Plaza". Other updates and tweaks to the site, such as the addition of the MP4 video format were also gradually phased in.

In April 27, 2022, during an appearance on "the DMZ," Wright announced that Bloggingheads will be ending, with the remaining segments moving to their own independent platforms.

Media recognition
Traditional media outlets, such at The New York Times and others, have written mostly favorable reviews of Bloggingheads.tv. Stories are also often written about individuals who take part in the video discussions, as they are often well known individuals in the scientific, academic, journalism, or blogosphere community.

The majority of coverage of the site, however, has been in the form of blog coverage sometimes on the form of the blog of the person participating in the Bloggingheads discussion, and sometimes in the form of other blogs.

Some events and personality appearances on Bloggingheads.tv have led to larger than usual amounts of media coverage, such as the March 24, 2007 Ann Althouse controversy described above, and the appearance of Andrew Sullivan on December 26, 2006 and January 1, 2007, when he discussed in the most clear terms up to that point his reversal of viewpoint on the Iraq War, and his plea of apology for supporting it in the first place.

Contributors to Bloggingheads.tv 
Apart from the regular contributors, a host of well known occasional guests have appeared, usually in the form of being interviewed. Among others, the political scientist Francis Fukuyama talked about his book America at the Crossroads; the Israeli journalist Gershom Gorenberg discussed his book The Accidental Empire (about the history of the settlements); The Washington Post columnist Joel Achenbach on an article of his about global warming deniers (among other topics); Andrew Sullivan on his book The Conservative Soul; biogerentologist Aubrey de Grey on how to defeat the "disease" of aging; philosopher David Chalmers; Nate Silver (of FiveThirtyEight.com); and Craig Venter, director of the Human Genome Project, who spoke of future scientific innovations he is currently pursuing.

See also 
Digital television
Interactive television
Internet television
Video on demand
Video podcast
Political podcast
Web TV
Webcast

References

External links 
 
New York Times Article on the operation of Bloggingheads.tv
Associated Press article in the NY Sun on the BloggingHeads.tv setup
Business Week article on Bloggingheads.tv

Television channels and stations established in 2005
American entertainment websites
Video hosting
Internet properties established in 2005
Web syndication
Internet television channels
Video podcasts
Political podcasts
Educational podcasts
Science podcasts
American political blogs
Science blogs
Video on demand services
2005 podcast debuts